Justin Soryal (born June 29, 1987) is a Canadian former professional ice hockey Forward who was known as an Enforcer who played in the American Hockey League (AHL).

Playing career
Undrafted out of the Ontario Hockey League with the Peterborough Petes, Soryal was signed as a free agent by the New York Rangers 
on March 12 of 2008.

On July 2, 2011, he was signed as a free agent by the Carolina Hurricanes and immediately signed to AHL affiliate, the Charlotte Checkers. During his first campaign with the Checkers in the 2011–12 season, Soryal had matched his career high of 10 points and led the Checkers in fights before on March 11, 2012, he was injured in a collision with Mike Duco, which resulted in a tibial plateau fracture. He missed the remainder of the season, and with the debilitating injury was unable to fully recover in the following 2012–13 season.

With the fracture jeopardising his balance and effectiveness in fights he announced his retirement due to the career-ending injury at the conclusion of his second year with the Checkers.

Career statistics

References

External links

1987 births
Living people
Charlotte Checkers (2010–) players
Connecticut Whale (AHL) players
Hartford Wolf Pack players
Peterborough Petes (ice hockey) players
Canadian ice hockey left wingers